Alexander Luard Wollaston FRS (14 June 1804 – 10 June 1874) was an amateur scientist.

The fourth son of George Hyde Wollaston (1765–1841), Alexander Luard Wollaston was educated at Hackney and Harrow before matriculating on 15 March 1823 at St John's College, Cambridge and then migrating on 10 November 1821 to Gonville and Caius College, Cambridge. He graduated there B.A. 1826 and M.A. 1829. He qualified M.B. in 1829 but never practised medicine. He was elected F.R.S. in 1829. He studied chemistry and natural philosophy in Paris.

On 16 March 1837 at Ryde he married Susanna Charlotte Morris (13 June 1807 – 1894). They had two sons and four daughters.

References

1804 births
1874 deaths
Fellows of the Royal Society